The Gutleutviertel is a quarter of Frankfurt am Main, Germany. It is part of the Ortsbezirk Innenstadt I.

The name Gutleut originates from the "Gutleuthof", once a refuge for lepers hosted by the "fraternity of the good people".

The former working class district has spruced up considerably in recent years with the development of a new housing and business district at the former West Harbor.

References

Districts of Frankfurt